The Senkaku mole (Mogera uchidai), also known as the Ryukyu mole, is a species of mammal in the family Talpidae. It was formerly classified as being the only species in the genus Nesoscaptor. It is endemic to the Uotsuri-jima (hiragana: うおつりじま) of the disputed territory of Senkaku Islands, also known as the Diaoyutai Islands. It is most similar to the Insular mole (Mogera insularis) of Taiwan and Mainland China.

Ecological threats
Its existence is threatened by habitat loss, due to the introduction of domestic goats in 1978; the goats now number more than 300 on this tiny island. Its conservation status was upgraded to CR in 2010 by the Biodiversity Center of Japan, although the IUCN still considers that current lack of population data prevents an accurate assessment. New population studies have evaluated the species as vulnerable.

References

Further reading
 伊澤雅子 「センカクモグラ」 『改訂・沖縄県の絶滅のおそれのある野生生物（動物編）-レッドデータおきなわ-』、沖縄県文化環境部自然保護課編 、2005年、19-20頁。

External links

Mogera
Mammals of Taiwan
Mammals of China
Mammals of Japan
Mammals described in 1991
Senkaku Islands
Taxonomy articles created by Polbot
Endemic fauna of the Ryukyu Islands